Haplogroup Q-M323 is a subclade of Y-DNA Haplogroup Q-M346. Haplogroup Q-M323 is defined by the presence of the M323 Single Nucleotide Polymorphism (SNP).

Distribution 
Q-M323 was discovered in the Yemeni Jewish population. In the time since its discovery, it has not been detected in other populations. It could then be exclusive to this population.

Associated SNPs 
Q-M323 is currently defined by the M323 SNP.

Subgroups 
This is Thomas Krahn at the Genomic Research Center's Draft tree Proposed Tree for haplogroup Q-M323.

 Q-M346 M346, L56, L57, L474, L892, L942
 Q-M323 M323

See also
Human Y-chromosome DNA haplogroup

Y-DNA Q-M242 Subclades

Y-DNA Backbone Tree

References

External links 
The Y-DNA Haplogroup Q Project

Q-M323